Arrow Creek is a stream in Kings Canyon National Park in Fresno County, California, United States. It is a tributary of the South Fork Kings River.

References

Rivers of Fresno County, California
Rivers of Northern California